The 22nd SS Volunteer Cavalry Division was a German Waffen-SS cavalry division which was active on the Eastern Front during the Second World War. The division was composed primarily of Hungarian Army Volksdeutsche conscripts who were transferred to the Waffen-SS following an agreement between Germany and Hungary. The division is commonly known under the Maria Theresia name in publications, although no documents have been found to confirm this name.

History

Formation and training
In December 1943, the 17th SS-Cavalry Regiment from the 8th SS Cavalry Division Florian Geyer was ordered to become the cadre for a new SS cavalry division. On 29 April 1944, the SS-Führungshauptamt authorised the division to be raised on basis of the 17th SS-Cavalry Regiment. The unit was sent to Kisbér in Hungary to begin forming the new division. While personnel from the Florian Geyer formed the nucleus of the division, the bulk of the troops were Hungarian Volksdeutsche (ethnic German) conscripts, transferred to the Waffen-SS following an agreement between Germany and Hungary.

The division was designated the 22nd SS Volunteer Cavalry Division Maria Theresia. The title referred to Maria Theresa, who had ruled Austria, Hungary and Bohemia in the 18th century. The symbol of the division, a cornflower, was emblazoned on the divisional shield. However, some authors claim that the division was always referred-to in official documents as the 22nd SS Volunteer Cavalry Division, and there are no records that would officially confirm it being named Maria Theresia.

Over the next months, the division continued its organization and training in Kisber, Győr and Budapest, equipped with mostly Hungarian weapons, vehicles and equipment. By June 1944, the divisional strength reached 4,900. In early August Oberkommando des Heeres (OKH) ordered all divisions forming up in Hungary to send units to the combat zone. The 52nd SS Volunteer Cavalry Regiment entrained for the front in Romania, while the 17th SS Volunteer Cavalry Regiment remained in Hungary to train the rest of the division.

Romania
Kampfgruppe Wiedemann consisted of SS Volunteer Cavalry Regiment 52 with attached artillery, Flak and reconnaissance elements. The Kampfgruppe was transported from Gyula-Szalonta, Hungary to Arad, Romania, where it was attached to General der Panzertruppe Hermann Breith's III Panzer Corps, stationed in the area around Debrecen. Elements of the division went into the line on 30 September, forming a defensive ring around the city of Arad along with the Hungarian 9th Infantry Division.

On 2 October, the Soviet spearheads of Marshal Rodion Malinovsky's 2nd Ukrainian Front began probing towards Arad. On 6 October, Malinovsky launched a major offensive, thus beginning the Battle of Debrecen. Units of the division were quickly outflanked and encircled. The second echelon of Soviet forces sought to destroy the pocket; on 8 October it was split in two. One unit broke out however, with troops swimming across the Harmas river to German lines on the other side. On 30 October the remaining 48 survivors, after a 200-mile trek across enemy territory, linked up with German forces at the town of Dunaföldvár, south of Budapest.

Operation Panzerfaust - Budapest
In mid-October 1944, pro-German Honvédség officers had revealed that the Hungarian Regent, Admiral Miklós Horthy, was negotiating a secret surrender to the Soviets. Hitler sent SS-Obersturmbannfüher Otto Skorzeny to deal with the problem. Skorzeny commandeered all available elements of the Maria Theresia to take part in Operation Panzerfaust, which began at 0600 on 15 October. In little over half an hour, a German column led by four Tiger IIs, including a number of Maria Theresia men, stormed Buda Castle and forced Horthy to abdicate. Simultaneously, Operation Panzerfaust resulted in the forced detainment of Horthy's youngest son, the pro-peace Nicholas Horthy. Pro-German Arrow Cross leader Ferenc Szálasi replaced Horthy, negotiations were broken off and Hungary remained in the war.

The battle-ready units of the division were assigned to the IX SS Mountain Corps, which was deployed in Budapest. The division arrived in early November 1944 and took up defensive positions. There it was encircled along with the rest of the Axis troops in the Hungarian capital and destroyed. Only some 170 men got out of the encirclement.

The survivors, along with those who had not been sent to Budapest, were used to form the 37th SS Volunteer Cavalry Division Lützow, with the remnants of the Flak units being transferred to 32nd SS Volunteer Panzergrenadier Division 30 Januar.

Commanders
 SS-Brigadeführer August Zehender (21 Apr 1944 – 11 Feb 1945)

Order of Battle, Budapest Jan 1945
 52nd SS Cavalry Regiment
 53rd SS Cavalry Regiment
 54th SS Cavalry Regiment
 17th SS Cavalry Regiment
 22nd SS Artillery Regiment
 22nd SS Panzer Reconnaissance Battalion
 22nd SS Panzer Jäger Battalion
 22nd SS Pionier Battalion
 22nd SS Nachrichten Battalion
 22nd SS Division Nachschubtruppen
 22nd SS Verwaltungstruppen Battalion
 22nd SS Sanitäts Battalion

See also
 List of Waffen-SS units
 Ranks and insignia of the Waffen-SS
 Waffen-SS foreign volunteers and conscripts

References

Footnotes

Bibliography
The Florian Geyer Division by Charles Tran

22
2*22
Military units and formations established in 1943
Military units and formations disestablished in 1945